Robert Lachal (born 11 January 1943) is an Australian rower. He competed in the men's eight event at the 1964 Summer Olympics.

References

1943 births
Living people
Australian male rowers
Olympic rowers of Australia
Rowers at the 1964 Summer Olympics
Place of birth missing (living people)
20th-century Australian people